"Glitter in Their Eyes" is a rock song written by Patti Smith and Oliver Ray, and released as a promo single from Patti Smith 2000 album Gung Ho. In 2001 the song was nominated for Grammy Award for Best Female Rock Vocal Performance.

Published Liner notes with the Gung Ho CD state the album was recorded at Sear Sound recording studio in New York City, mixed by Gil Norton and Danton Supple at The Church Studios in London, and Mastered by Ted Jensen at Sterling Sound in the Chelsea neighborhood of Manhattan. However, the Glitter in Their Eyes single was mixed at Eden Studios in London, and Mastered by Ted Jensen and Paul Angeli at Sterling Sound in NYC. Additional musicians for the single include: backing vocals of Michael Stipe (of R.E.M.) and Wade Raley; and the Solo Guitar work of Tom Verlaine (frontman for the New York rock band Television).

Notes

External links 
 Lyrics at official website

2000 singles
Patti Smith songs
Songs written by Patti Smith
2000 songs
Arista Records singles
Song recordings produced by Gil Norton